Raymond Blick (born 27 May 1930) is a British sprint canoer who competed in the late 1950s and early 1960s. Competing in two Summer Olympics, he earned his best finish of eighth in the K-2 10000 m event at Melbourne in 1956.

References
Raymond Blick's profile at Sports Reference.com

1930 births
Living people
Canoeists at the 1956 Summer Olympics
Canoeists at the 1960 Summer Olympics
Olympic canoeists of Great Britain
British male canoeists